Mahmudabad (also Romanized as Maḩmūdābād) is a village in Sardasht Rural District, Zeydun District, Behbahan County, Khuzestan Province, Iran. At the 2006 census, its population was 242, in 50 families.

References 

Populated places in Behbahan County